Anticosti National Park (French (official): Parc National d'Anticosti) is a provincial park of Quebec, Canada. It consists of 3 non-contiguous areas totalling  of land in the centre of Anticosti Island.

It is organized into 6 tourist sectors and 1 central zone:
 Baie-de-la-Tour
 Chicotte
 Chute-Vauréal
 Grotte-à-la-Patate
 Observation
 Vauréal-la-Mer
 Zone centrale

History
The idea of creating a park on Anticosti Island goes far back. Already in the 1920s, the richness of Anticosti's flora was highlighted by botanist Marie-Victorin, who described the canyon of the Vauréal River as a "remarkable sanctuary" for ferns. But for the following decades, the entire island was privately owned by a succession of logging companies who invested little or nothing in environmental protection.

In 1974, Anticosti Island was bought by the Government of Quebec and became public land once again. In 1987, the Regional County Municipality of Minganie officially incorporated the idea of creating a park in the Vauréal River area in its development plan. Thereafter, it took 14 years to complete the research, studies, planning, and public hearings. The Quebec government created the Anticosti National Park on April 26, 2001.

Park features
Natural attractions:
 Tour Bay (Bay de la Tour) - This bay on the north side of the island is noteworthy for its breathtaking seascape with huge cliffs surrounding the bay and excellent bird watching opportunities.
 Potato Cave (Grotte à la Patate) - This  cave is one of the longest caves in Quebec. It is named after the Potato River (Rivière à la Patate) which gets its name from a large granite erratic boulder shaped like a potato that is located at the river's mouth.
 Brick River Canyon
 Observation River Canyon

Activities:
 Hiking -  of trails of various difficulty
 Horseback riding
 Sea kayaking
 Guided tours

Park amenities:
 2 Visitor centres with restaurant, gasoline, and equipment rental
 Accommodation in inns, cabins, or campgrounds
 Picnic areas

References

National parks of Quebec
Protected areas of Côte-Nord
Anticosti Island
Protected areas established in 2001
2001 establishments in Quebec